Theodrada (ca. 784 – 844/853) was a daughter of Charlemagne (742–814) from his marriage to Fastrada. She became Abbess of the monastery of Argenteuil.

Life 
Theodrada was born the elder of the two daughters of Charlemagne's fourth, wife Fastrada, the twelfth child of the Frankish king. By 814, she was the Abbess of Notre-Dame d'Argenteuil. A document estimated to be from the year 828 notes that Theodrada received Argenteuil from her father. The abbey became independent of the Abbey of Saint-Denis on the occasion of the transfer, and as a Carolingian house monastery, was directly subordinate to the Frankish king.  However, in the aforementioned charter of 828, Theodrada restored the monastery to St. Denis on the condition that she would be allowed to use it for life, unless she voluntarily renounced it or was compensated with another monastery.

References

780s births
Frankish princesses
Year of death unknown
Carolingian dynasty
Children of Charlemagne
Women from the Carolingian Empire
8th-century Frankish women
9th-century French nuns
Daughters of emperors
Daughters of kings